Kusini Yengi (born 15 January 1999) is an Australian professional soccer player who plays as a striker for the Western Sydney Wanderers.

Early life
Yengi was born in Adelaide to Ben, a refugee advocate born in what is now South Sudan who emigrated to Australia in the early 1970s, and Emma Yengi, an English-born primatologist.

Club career

Adelaide United
On 21 February 2020, Yengi made his debut for Adelaide United coming on as a substitute in the 67th minute in a 5–2 defeat to the Western Sydney Wanderers, the club he would join two years later.

On 13 March 2021, he scored a goal and registered an assist against arch-rivals Melbourne Victory, with Yengi celebrating his goal by leaping over advertising hoardings and celebrating in front of Melbourne Victory supporters.

Western Sydney Wanderers
On 12 November 2022, Yengi, after an assist from Milos Ninkovic, scored the only goal to beat Sydney FC and win the Sydney Derby for the Western Sydney Wanderers.

Personal life
Yengi's younger brother, Tete, also plays as a forward for Veikkausliiga club VPS on loan from EFL League One club Ipswich Town.

Career statistics

References

External links

1999 births
Living people
Australian soccer players
Soccer players from Adelaide
Association football forwards
Adelaide Comets FC players
Adelaide United FC players
A-League Men players
Australian people of South Sudanese descent
Australian people of English descent